Dianne Cook may refer to:
 Dianne Cook (basketball)
 Dianne Cook (statistician)

See also
 Diane Cook (disambiguation)